
The Manhattan Trade School for Girls was a New York City public high school founded in 1902 by Mary Schenck Woolman, and was the first vocational school for female students established in the United States. It was established by philanthropic reformers to provide training for young women to work in trades such as garment factory work. It was originally located on West 14th Street, but was moved to East 23rd Street in 1906–1907. To accommodate growing enrollment, a new building was constructed and designed by C. B. J. Snyder in 1915 at 127 East 22nd Street. The building now houses The School of the Future, a New York City public middle school and high school.

Gallery
The following photographs of activities at the Manhattan Trade School for Girls date to 1916:

Documentary
A documentary film was made about the school in 1911. The film is available on DVD from Image Entertainment as part of the box set Treasures III: Social Issues in American Film, 1900–1934 with a ragtime style musical score by Elena Ruehr composed specifically for the film

References

Sources

Further reading 

 
 

 
 

Educational institutions established in 1902
Public high schools in Manhattan
1902 establishments in New York City
Women in New York City
Girls' schools in New York City